Christopher Bausor  (born 10 November 1989) is a field hockey player from Australia, who plays as a midfielder.

Personal life
Chris Bausor was born and raised in Perth, Western Australia.

He studied (but unconfirmed if finished) a degree in mechanical engineering at the University of Western Australia.

Career

State level
At state representative level, Bausor plays hockey for his home state in the Australian Hockey League, for the WA Thundersticks.

National teams

Under–21
In 2009, Bausor was a member of the 'Burras' team at the Junior World Cup held in Johor Bahru, Malaysia and Singapore. Australia won a bronze medal at the tournament, with Bausor scoring once during the campaign.

Kookaburras
Bausor made his senior international debut in 2011, during a five-nations tournament in Paris, France.

Since his debut, Bausor has made 23 appearances for the Kookaburras, most recently in 2016 at the International Festival of Hockey in Melbourne, Victoria.

International goals

References

External links
 
 

1989 births
Living people
Australian male field hockey players